The women's high jump at the 2016 European Athletics Championships took place at the Olympic Stadium on 6 and 7 July.

Records

Schedule

Results

Qualification

Qualification: 1.92 m (Q) or best 12 performances (q)

Final

References

High Jump W
High jump at the European Athletics Championships
2016 in women's athletics